Hervik is a village in Tysvær municipality in Rogaland county, Norway. The village is known for production of fruit syrup, juice, and jam. Products are sold by mail order, at 7-Eleven and in delicatessens nationwide in Norway.

History
The village has been populated since around the 14th century and has grave sites dating from the Bronze Age. The name Hervik is etymologically connected to Harwich in England, Here-wic, which means a cove (vik in Norwegian) populated by an army (hær in Norwegian). In medieval sources the village is known as Heruicum.

References

Villages in Rogaland
Tysvær